Reading Science Fiction is a collection of 22 short essays edited by James Gunn, Marleen S. Barr & Matthew Candelaria. The collection explores a wide range of theoretical approaches to studying science fiction, such as gender studies, post colonialism and structuralism. The authors reference the various mediums through which science fiction has appeared including literature, film, television, as well as video games to define science fiction as a genre, trace its origins, as well as its parallels with contemporary society.

Sections
Introduction - James Gunn

Part I:  Mapping Science Fiction
Defining Science Fiction - Eric S. Rabkin
 What is Science Fiction - and How It Grew - H. Bruce Franklin
 Narrative Strategies in Science Fiction - Brian Stableford
There is No Such Thing as Science Fiction - Sherryl Vint & Mark Bould

Part II:  Science Fiction and Popular Culture
Science Fiction Movies: the Feud of Eye and Idea - George Zebrowski
The Feedback Loop - Michael Cassutt
Computers in Science Fiction - Brooks Landon
Cross Fertilization or Coincidence? Science Fiction and videogames - Orson Scott Card

Part III: Theoretical Approaches to Science Fiction
Gender is a problem that can be solved - Jane Donawerth
Marxism and Science Fiction - Carl Freedman
Reading Science Fiction with Postcolonial Theory - Matthew Candelaria
Encountering International Science Fiction Through a Latin American Lens - Roberto de Sousa Causo

Part IV: Reading Science Fiction in the Classroom
Reading Science Fiction as Science Fiction - James Gunn
 Reading Joanna Russ in Context: Science, Utopia and Post modernity - Jeanne Cortiel
Reading Science Fiction's Interdisciplinary Conversation with Science and Technology STudies -R. Doug Davis & Lisa Yazek

Part V: Science Fiction and Diverse Disciplines
Neuroscience Fiction Redux - Joseph D. Miller
Physics through Science Fiction - Gregory Benford
Science Fiction and Biology - Pamela Sargent
Science Fiction and Philosophy - James Gunn
Science Fiction and the Internet - Bruce Sterling
The Reading Science Fiction Blog - Marleen S. Barr

Reception
Several of the collection's essays were praised, however, the collection as a whole received criticism for not being entirely accessible to students new to science fiction.

References

Essays about literature
Works about science fiction
2008 non-fiction books
Palgrave Macmillan books